Souris-Estevan is a former provincial electoral district for the Legislative Assembly of the province of Saskatchewan, Canada. This district was created for the 7th Saskatchewan general election in 1934 by combining the districts of Souris and Estevan.

The constituency was dissolved and divided between the districts of Estevan and Cannington (as "Souris-Cannington") before the 18th Saskatchewan general election in 1975.

Members of the Legislative Assembly

Election results

|-

 
|Conservative
|William Oliver Fraser
|align="right"|2,960
|align="right"|38.39%
|align="right"|–

|Farmer-Labour
|H. Gordon Gallaway
|align="right"|1,215
|align="right"|15.75%
|align="right"|–
|- bgcolor="white"
!align="left" colspan=3|Total
!align="right"|7,711
!align="right"|100.00%
!align="right"|

|-

 
|CCF
|William Glenroy Allen
|align="right"|3,467
|align="right"|41.82%
|align="right"|+26.07

|- bgcolor="white"
!align="left" colspan=3|Total
!align="right"|8,291
!align="right"|100.00%
!align="right"|

|-
 
| style="width: 130px"|CCF
|Charles Cuming
|align="right"|3,933
|align="right"|50.09%
|align="right"|+8.27

 
|Prog. Conservative
|Herbert S. Penny
|align="right"|1,259
|align="right"|16.03%
|align="right"|-
|- bgcolor="white"
!align="left" colspan=3|Total
!align="right"|7,852
!align="right"|100.00%
!align="right"|

|-

 
|CCF
|Charles Cuming
|align="right"|4,741
|align="right"|47.02%
|align="right"|-3.07

|- bgcolor="white"
!align="left" colspan=3|Total
!align="right"|10,082
!align="right"|100.00%
!align="right"|

|-

 
|CCF
|E.J.B. Quist
|align="right"|5,064
|align="right"|49.24%
|align="right"|+2.22
|- bgcolor="white"
!align="left" colspan=3|Total
!align="right"|10,285
!align="right"|100.00%
!align="right"|

|-
 
| style="width: 130px"|Progressive Conservative
|Robert Kohaly
|align="right"|5,285
|align="right"|57.43%
|align="right"|-
 
|CCF
|William Schieman
|align="right"|3,918
|align="right"|42.57%
|align="right"|-6.67
|- bgcolor="white"
!align="left" colspan=3|Total
!align="right"|9,203
!align="right"|100.00%
!align="right"|

|-
 
| style="width: 130px"|CCF
|Kim Thorson
|align="right"|3,919
|align="right"|37.10%
|align="right"|-5.47

 
|Prog. Conservative
|Robert Kohaly
|align="right"|2,130
|align="right"|20.17%
|align="right"|-37.26

|- bgcolor="white"
!align="left" colspan=3|Total
!align="right"|10,561
!align="right"|100.00%
!align="right"|

|-

 
|CCF
|Kim Thorson
|align="right"|3,935
|align="right"|35.21%
|align="right"|-1.89

 
|Prog. Conservative
|E. Hudson
|align="right"|936
|align="right"|8.38%
|align="right"|-11.79
|- bgcolor="white"
!align="left" colspan=3|Total
!align="right"|11,175
!align="right"|100.00%
!align="right"|

|-

 
|CCF
|Ivar J. Kristianson
|align="right"|4,040
|align="right"|39.38%
|align="right"|+4.17
|- bgcolor="white"
!align="left" colspan=3|Total
!align="right"|10,260
!align="right"|100.00%
!align="right"|

|-

 
|NDP
|Russell Brown
|align="right"|4,335
|align="right"|45.48%
|align="right"|+6.10
|- bgcolor="white"
!align="left" colspan=3|Total
!align="right"|9,532
!align="right"|100.00%
!align="right"|

|-
 
| style="width: 130px"|NDP
|Russell Brown
|align="right"|4,935
|align="right"|51.33%
|align="right"|+5.85

|- bgcolor="white"
!align="left" colspan=3|Total
!align="right"|9,615
!align="right"|100.00%
!align="right"|

|-
 
| style="width: 130px"|NDP
|Kim Thorson
|align="right"|4,855
|align="right"|54.35%
|align="right"|+3.02

|- bgcolor="white"
!align="left" colspan=3|Total
!align="right"|8,933
!align="right"|100.00%
!align="right"|

See also 
Electoral district (Canada)
List of Saskatchewan provincial electoral districts
List of Saskatchewan general elections
List of political parties in Saskatchewan

References 
 Saskatchewan Archives Board – Saskatchewan Election Results By Electoral Division

Former provincial electoral districts of Saskatchewan